Dzaïr News was an Arabic-language satellite television channel broadcasting from Hydra. Dzair News was set up by Algerian businessman Ali Haddad with a number of Arab intellectuals from Algeria and the Arab World. The channel ceased operations on June 25, 2019.

History
Dzair News was founded on 18 May 2014, and started to broadcast its programs on the same day.
The channel ceased operations on June 25, 2019.

Events
Notable events to which Dzair News and its sister channels hold broadcasting rights include:

Football 
 Algerian Ligue Professionnelle 2

Programs
Beyond the Fact
The World Today
File and Discussion
Bearings
Private Meeting
100% Sport
Cultural and Faces
Eighth Day
Talk in Politics
Economia
Spectra

References

External links
 

Arab mass media
Television in Algeria
Arabic-language television stations
Arabic-language television
Television channels and stations established in 2014
Television channels and stations disestablished in 2019
Television stations in Algeria
2001 establishments in Algeria
2019 disestablishments in Algeria